Glenn E. Plummer is an American film and television actor best known as Timmy Rawlins in ER (1994–2007), and Vic Trammel in Sons of Anarchy (2008–2009).

Biography
Plummer was born in Richmond, California.

Career
Plummer has appeared in numerous films and television series, primarily in supporting roles or small bit parts, such as High Top in Colors. His prominent roles came in the films Menace II Society, Speed, Bones, Showgirls, South Central, The Day After Tomorrow, The Salton Sea and Saw II. In 2014, he produced and was a collaborating writer of the horror thriller film Teeth and Blood.

Plummer was nominated for the Independent Spirit Award for Best Supporting Male for his performance in Pastime.

Filmography

Film

Television

References

External links

Year of birth missing (living people)
Living people
20th-century American male actors
21st-century American male actors
African-American male actors
American male film actors
American male television actors
Male actors from California
People from Richmond, California
20th-century African-American people
21st-century African-American people